The Coal City Marathon is an annual international event held in Enugu State, Nigeria.

Overview 
The Coal City Marathon held on 24 November 2018, was the first ever international half marathon to be held in the entire South-East Zone of Nigeria. A 21 Kilometer half marathon which started off from Michael Okpara Square, Independence Layout Enugu and ended at the Nnamdi Azikiwe Stadium along Ogui Road, Enugu. The event saw over 1,320 local and International runners from Kenya, Ethiopia and Cameroun.

2019 
The 2019 coal city marathon is scheduled to take place in November according to the Athletics Federation of Nigeria
Tentative 2019 Programme  and has been listed as one of the five upcoming races every Nigerian should look forward to in 2019.

2018 
The half marathon which is certified by the AFN (Athletics Federation of Nigeria) had the routes inspected and approved by the officials  and saw three Nigerians and three Kenyans emerging as winners. The 2018 winner received 3,500 dollars as prize money while the first and second runners-up received 3,000 and 2,500 dollars respectively.

Winners

Reasons for the Marathon 
 To put Enugu State on the World Map of Athletics Excellence, Sports Development and Talent Discovery
 Showcase the culture and Tourism prospects of the state to the world.

References 

Marathons in Nigeria